Gentiana macrophylla, the large leaf gentian, is called qin jiao(秦艽) in Chinese.  Synonyms include G. straminea, G. crassiaulisor, and G. dahurica. It is found in China, Kazakhstan, Mongolia and Russia.

Chemistry
Chemical constituents include gentianine, gentianidine, gentiopicroside, and gentianol.

Gallery

References

macrophylla
Flora of China
Flora of Kazakhstan
Flora of Mongolia
Flora of Russia